African reptiles are categorized by reptilian order:

Order Testudines: turtles

Order Squamata: snakes and lizards

Acanthocercus
Acanthodactylus erythrurus
Acanthodactylus mechriguensis
Agama (genus)
Agama agama
Agama aculeata
Agama africana
Agama armata
Agama caudospinosa
Agama mwanzae
Agama rueppelli
Aspidelaps
Atheris ceratophora
Atheris chlorechis
Atheris desaixi
Atheris hispida
Atheris katangensis
Atheris nitschei
Atheris squamigera
Bitis arietans
Bitis atropos
Bitis caudalis
Bitis cornuta
Bitis gabonica
Bitis heraldica
Bitis inornata
Bitis nasicornis
Bitis parviocula
Bitis peringueyi
Bitis rubida
Bitis schneideri
Bitis worthingtoni
Bitis xeropaga
Boomslang
Boulengerina annulata
Cape Cobra
Cape Dwarf Chameleon
Chalcides armitagei
Chalcides montanus
Chalcides ocellatus
Chalcides pulchellus
Chalcides regazzii
Chalcides thierryi
Chamaeleo hoehnelii
Chamaeleo johnstoni
Chamaeleo melleri
Charina
Common Egg-eater
Eastern green mamba
Echis coloratus
Fischer's Chameleon
Hemidactylus brookii
Hemidactylus echinus
Hemidactylus frenatus
Hemidactylus mabouia
Hemidactylus muriceus
Hemidactylus pseudomuriceus
Henkel's Leaf-tailed Gecko
Jackson's Chameleon
Karoo Dwarf Chameleon
Lined day gecko
Madagascarophis
Mamba
Mozambique Spitting Cobra
Naja ashei
Naja nigricollis
Namaqua Chameleon
Nile monitor
Nucras caesicaudata
Paranaja multifasciata
Phelsuma pusilla pusilla
Psudohaje goldii
Python anchietae
Python regius
Python sebae
Python sebae natalensis
Red Spitting Cobra
Rhamphiophis oxyrhynchus
Rhampholeon spectrum
Rhampholeon brevicaudatus
Rinkhals
Rosette-Nosed Chameleon
Savannah monitor
Sharp-nosed Chameleon
Small-spotted Lizard
Spitting cobra
Strange-nosed Chameleon
Trachylepis striata
Uromastyx geyri
Uroplatus
Uroplatus guentheri
Uroplatus lineatus
Uroplatus phantasticus
Uroplatus fimbriatus
Uroplatus silkorae
Varanus albigularis
Varanus albigularis angolensis 
Varanus albigularis microstictus
Varanus albigularis ionidesi
Varanus griseus
Vipera monticola
Western green mamba
Yellow-throated day gecko

Order Crocodilia: crocodiles

Nile Crocodile
Crocodile
Dwarf Crocodile
Slender-snouted Crocodile

References

 Africa